General elections were held in Panama on 20 May 1960, electing both a new President of the Republic and a new National Assembly.

According to Jan Knippers Black and Edmundo Flores, "Ernesto de la Guardia's administration had been overwhelmed by the rioting and other problems, and the National Patriotic Coalition, lacking effective opposition in the National Assembly, began to disintegrate. Most dissenting factions joined the National Liberal Party in the National Opposition Union."

The 1960 election was without precedent in Panama. For once the usual charges of illegal intervention by the National Guard were absent, and the opposition Liberal coalition candidate, Roberto Francisco Chiari Remón, was declared the winner and installed in office in an unexpectedly peaceful transfer of power.

Results

President

National Assembly

References

Panama
General
Elections in Panama
Presidential elections in Panama